Harmostes reflexulus is a species of scentless plant bug in the family Rhopalidae. It is found in the Caribbean Sea, Central America, North America, and South America.

Description 
Harmostes reflexulus are small bugs.

Habitat 
Harmostes reflexulus are most commonly found on herbs and flowers in fields.

References

External links

 

Articles created by Qbugbot
Insects described in 1832
Rhopalinae